Earth Defense Force 2017 is a third-person shooter developed by Sandlot, and published by D3 Publisher, for the Xbox 360. It is the follow-up to Global Defence Force, and is the first game in the Earth Defense Force series (as well as the first game based on D3's Simple series of budget games) to be released in North America. Earth Defense Force 3 was the best selling Games on Demand game in Japan for 2009. The game was released on the PlayStation Vita in Japan on 27 September 2012. It was released digital-only in North America on January 8, 2013 and in the PAL region on January 16, 2013. A port of the game was released for the Nintendo Switch in Japan on October 14, 2021.

Story
During year 2013, radio waves from deep space are received by scientists, showing people an alien race. During year 2015, the Earth Defense Force, a unified multinational military organization sponsored by nearly every country, is established in case these space aliens are proven to be hostile. Two years later, (during 2017) first contact is made because suddenly hundreds of unidentified flying objects soon arrive and hover over major cities across the globe, led by a massive mothership positioned over Tokyo, Japan. As the EDF is mobilized, giant acid spitting insects resembling ants begin assaulting many civilians. And this main character is an unnamed Captain in Storm 1, and is a Japanese unit regarded as the best in the EDF, and helps in fighting back at these ants in Tokyo. These UFOs soon release more ants, showing these such hostile intentions. An air assault is attempted on this mothership, but is destroyed by alien UFO gunships. And because this operation becomes a failure, surviving EDF forces abandon cities and begin a guerrilla campaign in rural areas.

While patrolling the Japanese countryside, Storm 1 is informed by command that an extensive alien nest is being built underground. From this nest, the aliens will be able to spawn an infinite number of bugs and bypass EDF defenses. Intelligence provided by Scout Teams shows that a single alien Queen is at the center of the nest, and its destruction will stop the production of the rapidly multiplying bugs. Storm 1 assaults the nest with the help of all available Ranger Teams, and successfully kills the Queen. A few days later, Storm 1 assists a Scout Team with monitoring the mothership, which has landed on the Japanese coast and appears dormant, damaged, and defenseless. Oddly, it is observed sucking in huge amounts of air and releasing carbon dioxide, implying that the ship is more than a synthetic machine, and may be the hive intelligence controlling the aliens. Command orders the Teams to assault the mothership with heavy weapons, but it re-activates and wipes out the Scout Team.

Before the alien mothership retreats, it drops a massive four-legged mecha on the coast, which uses a powerful plasma cannon to assault EDF positions. Storm 1 destroys the mecha before it can cause too much harm, and later neutralizes several cyborg creatures of Godzilla proportions. While the Japanese contingent of the EDF continues to hold out, the rest of the world is soon overrun and enslaved. Japan stands as the last unoccupied territory. All remaining insects and mechs on the ground make a beeline to the bombed-out ruins of Tokyo, where the mothership has stopped to repair and arm an enormous cannon, capable of destroying anything in its path. The remaining EDF forces move to block the alien advance so Storm 1 can destroy the mothership. Storm 1 focuses fire on the mothership and destroys it. The remaining alien forces become disorganized and flee.

Gameplay
The player takes control of an EDF soldier who is part of the elite unit Storm 1. To fight these alien forces the player can access over 150 weapons in the game, ranging from assault rifles and sniper rifles to rocket launchers, grenades and laser weapons. Only two weapons may be selected for each mission. Some levels also contain vehicles which can be commandeered; a tank, a helicopter, a hoverbike and a bipedal mecha are available. The game takes place across 53 levels featuring destructible environments, taking place in settings such as cities and caves. There is no penalty for collateral damage that is inflicted on the environment by the player, for instance buildings will crumble after sustaining a single hit from a rocket launcher or grenade. Other EDF soldiers can be recruited or followed, and attack enemies on sight, as well as provide radio chatter.

There are five difficulty levels. More effective weapons are dropped by the enemies in the game at the higher difficulty levels, encouraging players to repeat the missions. In addition to weapons, armor enhancements which function as permanent maximum health bonuses are dropped along with healing items.

PlayStation Vita port
A PlayStation Vita version of the game was announced on June 5, 2012 as Earth Defense Forces 3 Portable. The new version includes both local and online co-operative play, as well as the return of Palewing from Earth Defense Force 2. The game was released on September 27, 2012 in Japan. It was released digital-only in North America on January 8, 2013 and in Europe and Australia on January 16, 2013 as Earth Defense Force 2017 Portable.

Reception

The game received "average" reviews on both platforms according to the review aggregation website Metacritic.  In Japan, Famitsu gave it a score of two sevens and two eights for the Xbox 360 version, and three eights and one seven for the Vita version; while Famitsu X360 gave the former console version a score of one seven, two eights, and one nine.

Reviewers pointed out that the Xbox 360 version suffered from relatively poor graphics, a lack of many standard features and characteristically poor voice acting. However, said console version still received solid reviews from western critics, whose general consensus was that it is "inexplicably fun". Some advocate it as a "gamers' game" with nothing in the way of the pure game, like Kieron Gillen in his Eurogamer review; the console version's strong emphasis on arcade-style gameplay, with massively destructive weapons and hordes of enemies, suggests that this may have been the driving philosophy behind its design. Some outlets, however, claimed that said console version paled in comparison to its predecessor, which had a larger range of enemies, missions, weapons and a second playable character. Edge, for example, gave it six out of ten and said, "The illusion of epic-scale warfare remains a powerful and entertaining one, broken most significantly by the player’s need to avoid overexposing themselves to its fundamentally tedious nature."

Notes

References

External links
  
 

2006 video games
Alien invasions in video games
Cooperative video games
D3 Publisher games
Earth Defense Force
Fiction set in 2017
Kaiju video games
Multiplayer and single-player video games
Nintendo Switch games
PlayStation Vita games
Sandlot games
Third-person shooters
Video game sequels
Video games developed in Japan
Video games scored by Masafumi Takada
Video games set in 2017
Xbox 360 games
Video games about ants